Grays River is a census-designated place (CDP) in Wahkiakum County, Washington. Grays River stands on the north bank of the lower Grays River, which flows into the Columbia River Estuary.  The National Register of Historic Places-listed Grays River Covered Bridge crosses the Grays River in the community. It is the only such bridge still in use in Washington. The population was 263 as of the 2010 census. The Grays River community is part of the Naselle-Grays River Valley School District, a K-12 school district of about 670 students.

Geography
Grays River is located at  (46.367836, -123.581335).

According to the United States Census Bureau, the CDP has a total area of 20.19 square miles (52.29 km2), of which 20.13 square miles (52.12 km2) of it is land and 0.07 square miles (0.17 km2) of it (0.33%) is water.

Climate
Grays River has a subtropical Mediterranean climate (Köppen Csb).

Being that Grays River is located only  from the coast and there are no significant hills or mountains between it and the coast, Grays River receives a great deal of precipitation. Measurable precipitation falls on Grays River an average of 192 days a year.

Demographics

As of the census of 2010, there were 263 people, 110 households, and 83 families residing in the CDP. The population density was 13.03 people per square mile (5.03/km2). There were 128 housing units at an average density of 6.34/sq mi (2.45/km2). The racial makeup of the CDP was 94.3% White, 0.4% African American, 0.4% Native American, 1.1% Asian, 0.0% Pacific Islander, 1.5% from other races, and 2.3% from two or more races. Hispanic or Latino of any race were 2.7% of the population.

There were 110 households, out of which 19.1% had children under the age of 18 living with them, 68.2% were married couples living together, 6.4% had a female householder with no husband present, and 24.5% were non-families. 20.9% of all households were made up of individuals, and 13.6% had someone living alone who was 65 years of age or older. The average household size was 2.39 and the average family size was 2.71.

In the CDP, the age distribution of the population shows 18.3% under the age of 18, 5.7% from 18 to 24, 13.3% from 25 to 44, 38.0% from 45 to 64, and 24.7% who were 65 years of age or older. The median age was 55.5 years. For every 100 females, there were 103.9 males. For every 100 females age 18 and over, there were 112.9 males.

External links
Naselle-Grays River Valley School District website

References

Census-designated places in Wahkiakum County, Washington
Census-designated places in Washington (state)